Freeport High School is a public high school in Freeport, Walton County, Florida, United States. The school's mascot is the Bulldog. The school colors are orange and blue.

Notable alumni 
 Regina Jaquess, 2017 World Championship Gold Medalist

References

Educational institutions in the United States with year of establishment missing
Public high schools in Florida
Schools in Walton County, Florida